Fifth Avenue Place (originally "Hillman Tower", sometimes called Highmark Place) is a skyscraper in Pittsburgh, Pennsylvania. United States. The building is owned by Highmark subsidiary Jenkins Empire Associates and has served as the company's headquarters since it was completed in 1988.

The building was completed on April 14, 1988 and it has 31 floors. The structure is made up of a unique granite frame for roughly the first , then collapses inward in a pyramidal shape for another  roof structure. The roof utilizes four prisms clad in granite and encloses a penthouse area that stores the mechanics for the building as well as the cooling towers. Before Highmark's branding of the top of the tower, there were video screens at the base of the decorative summit of the building.

Protruding from the top of the skyscraper is a  mast manufactured by Meyer Industry of Minnesota. Despite its rounded appearance, the 13-story steel structure is actually 12-sided and measures four feet in diameter. Due to high winds, the mast allows for up to three feet of sway. The height at the top of the mast represents the intended height for the building when it was in development. However, the city decided that that height would not fit in well with the skyline, so the height of the main structure was restricted to what it is today.

Crane operator David Angle, the father of future Olympic wrestler and professional wrestler Kurt Angle, was killed in a construction accident during construction of Fifth Avenue Place on August 29, 1984.

Retail

There is a shopping center on the first two floors.
 A renovation of the space was announced in September 2019; the remodeled shopping mall will mainly focus on dining and is planned to include an open atrium and more natural lighting, plus other amenities. The renovation is expected to take three years to complete.

See also
List of tallest buildings in Pittsburgh
Pittsburgh

References

Further reading

External links

Emporis

Skyscraper office buildings in Pittsburgh
Postmodern architecture in Pennsylvania

Office buildings completed in 1988